Matt Finkes Matthew Scott "Matt" Finkes (born February 12, 1975) is an American former professional football defensive end who played in the NFL for the New York Jets in 1997.

References

Living people
1975 births
New York Jets players
American football defensive ends
Players of American football from Ohio
Ohio State Buckeyes football players
People from Piqua, Ohio